Barbajuan (also spelled barbagiuan or barbagiuai) is an appetizer mainly found in the eastern part of the French Riviera, in the western part of Liguria and in Monaco. A kind of fritter stuffed with Swiss chard and ricotta, among other ingredients, it originates from Monaco, where it is especially eaten on the national day, 19 November. The word means Uncle John in Monégasque.

See also
 List of hors d'oeuvre
 List of stuffed dishes

External links
 Barbajuan recipe

References 
Italian cuisine
French cuisine
Monegasque cuisine
Appetizers
Stuffed dishes
Fritters
Cheese dishes